John Price (died 1602) was a Welsh politician.
 
He was the eldest son of Matthew Price of Newtown, Montgomeryshire.

He was elected a Member (MP) of the Parliament of England for Montgomery Boroughs in 1563 and for Montgomeryshire in 1572. He was a Justice of the Peace for Montgomeryshire from c.1564 and was appointed High Sheriff of Montgomeryshire for 1565–66. He was also High Sheriff of Cardiganshire for 1569–70. From 1588 he was a deputy lieutenant for Montgomeryshire.

He married Elizabeth, the daughter of Rhys ap Morris ap Owain, of Aberbechan, near Newtown, with whom he had 4 sons and 4 daughters.

References

 

16th-century births
1602 deaths
People from Montgomeryshire
Members of the Parliament of England (pre-1707) for constituencies in Wales
English MPs 1563–1567
English MPs 1572–1583
High Sheriffs of Montgomeryshire
High Sheriffs of Cardiganshire
Deputy Lieutenants of Montgomeryshire